was a famous philosopher and author from Japan. He graduated from the University of Tokyo's Department of Philosophy in 1883. He helped found the Society for Political Education and its magazine "Nihonjin" (Japanese People). In 1907 the Nihonjin Magazine was renamed "Nihon Oyobi Nihonjin" (Japan and The Japanese People). It was at this time that Hasegawa Nyozekan was recruited to the magazine.

Miyake's other works included "Shinzenbi Nihonjin" (Goodness, truth and beauty of The Japanese People) and "Giakushu Nihonjin" (Falsehoods, evil and ugliness of the Japanese People).

Political views
Miyake was a Cooperative Nationalist and differed in opinion from Universalists. He felt that Japan was first a member of the Asian community and secondly a member of the global community. Also Japan should hold onto and preserve its cultural heritage from before the Meiji era as it helped to strengthen Asian culture and, by doing so, world culture.

Miyake felt Japan should make it its mission to study Asia, oppose western imperialism, and nurture the distinctive Japanese sense of beauty.

References

Portraits of Modern Japanese Historical Figures
Making Japanese – Chapter Three: Culture Wars

External links
 

1860 births
1945 deaths
People from Kanazawa, Ishikawa
Japanese philosophers
Japanese nationalists
Japanese journalists
Recipients of the Order of Culture